Teresita Ssen Lacsamana Marquez (born May 4, 1992), popularly known as Winwyn Marquez, is a Filipino actress, model, dancer and beauty queen who was crowned the first Reina Hispanoamericana Filipinas title in the Miss World Philippines 2017 pageant and eventually won the Reina Hispanoamericana 2017 title in Santa Cruz, Bolivia on November 4, 2017.

Marquez is an advocate of education and has a Community Engagement Program that goes to different mission areas and public schools and is part of GMA Network.

Early life and education
Marquez has a degree in Bachelor of Science in Business Administration Major in Marketing Management at San Beda College Alabang and has earned her Teachers Certificate at Southville International School and Colleges.

She was born to actor-politician Joey Márquez and actress-politician Alma Moreno but she went on to carve a name for herself as a dancer and as an actress.

Marquez is the half-sister of Mark Anthony Fernández and Vandolph Quizon. She is also the niece of Miss International 1979 Melanie Marquez. She is also a cousin of Michelle Marquez Dee Miss World Philippines 2019.

Since 2012, Alden Richards and Michael De Mesa Joined Her to be a Supporting Cast and Guest Cast in One True Love and Valiente.

Pageantry

Binibining Pilipinas 2015
Marquez was an official candidate for Binibining Pilipinas 2015 that was held at the Smart Araneta Coliseum on March 15, 2015. She represented Parañaque City. She finished as a Top 15 finalist and also won the Best National Costume, Miss Talent and She's So JAG awards.

Miss World Philippines 2017
Marquez was an official candidate for Miss World Philippines 2017. The pageant happened in Mall of Asia Arena on September 3, 2017 which was hosted by Iya Villania-Arellano, KC Montero, and Carla Abellana where she was  crowned Reina Hispanoamericana Filipinas 2017. Marquez also won awards the Miss Savoy Hotel Boracay, Fast Track Talent and Fast Track Beach Beauty (Miss Bench Body) awards.

Reina Hispanoamericana 2017
She represented the Philippines at the Reina Hispanoamericana 2017 pageant that was held in Santa Cruz, Bolivia. She is the first-ever representative of the Philippines and the only Asian candidate in the pageant. At the conclusion of the event, she was crowned the winner and bagged the Miss Ipanema award.

Filmography

Television

Movies

Personal life
On May 1, 2022, Marquez shared a photo on Instagram of her first child, a baby girl named Luna Teresita Rayn, with her non-showbiz boyfriend.

References

External links

1992 births
Living people
Binibining Pilipinas contestants
People from Parañaque
Actresses from Metro Manila
Filipino television actresses
Filipino female dancers
GMA Network personalities
Miss World Philippines winners
San Beda University alumni